Island of the Dead is a 1955 West German drama film directed by Viktor Tourjansky and starring Willy Birgel, Inge Egger and Folke Sundquist. It was shot at the Bavaria Studios in Munich. The film's sets were designed by the art director Dieter Bartels and Wilhelm Vorwerg. It premiered at the Marmorhaus in Berlin.

Cast
 Willy Birgel as Frank
 Inge Egger as Maria
 Folke Sundquist as Stefan
 Charles Regnier as Pater Markus
 Paul Esser as Fritz Kahlmayer
 Karin Hardt as Erna Kahlmayer
 Alexander Kerst as Dr. Henry Gordon
 Jeanette Schultze as Luise Garbusch
 Petra Peters as Gisela
 Robert Meyn as Kapitän
 Joseph Offenbach as Dr. Gabin
 Michael Cramer as von Bargen
 Hilde Körber as Frau Hürti
 Ingrid Stenn as Nicolette
 Karl-Heinz Peters as Konstantin

References

Bibliography 
 Hans-Michael Bock and Tim Bergfelder. The Concise Cinegraph: An Encyclopedia of German Cinema. Berghahn Books, 2009.

External links 
 

1955 films
West German films
German drama films
1955 drama films
1950s German-language films
Films directed by Victor Tourjansky
Films based on German novels
Films set in Oceania
Films about infectious diseases
Works about leprosy
1950s German films
Films shot at Bavaria Studios